Sea of Monsters or The Sea of Monsters may refer to:

 Sea of Monsters, an instrumental orchestral piece conducted and composed by George Martin for the 1968 film Yellow Submarine 
 The Sea of Monsters, a fantasy-adventure novel the Percy Jackson series
 Percy Jackson: Sea of Monsters, the film adaptation of the Percy Jackson novel

See also
 Sea Monsters (disambiguation)
 Monster (disambiguation)
 Sea (disambiguation)